The State Line Slough is a stream in Clayton County, Iowa. The state boundary between Iowa and Wisconsin runs down the center of State Line Slough as it is a part of the Mississippi River.

Pikes Peak State Park is nearby. There are popular fish species at this Lake including yellow perch and northern pike.

See also
State Line Slough (Missouri)
List of rivers of Iowa

References 

Rivers of Clayton County, Iowa